Elachista perniva is a moth of the family Elachistidae. It is found in North America in Saskatchewan, Colorado and Wyoming.

The costa in the basal fifth of the forewing is grey. The wing is otherwise snow-white. The hindwing varies in colour from light grey to dark brownish grey. The underside of the wings is dark grey.

Etymology
The species name is derived from Latin per- and niveus  (meaning very snowy).

References

Moths described in 1997
perniva
Endemic fauna of the United States
Moths of North America